Thyella Rafina Football Club is a Greek football club based in Rafina, Attica, Greece.

The club was founded in 1957. They will play in Gamma Ethniki for the season 2022–23.

History
The union was created by lignite miners, who worked for the lignite mining company (coal), which operated in the "Intersection" area of Rafina.

Colours
Green for many pines and black for charcoal which the area produced.

Honours

Domestic
 Fourth Division League Champions: 1
 2020–21
 Eastern Attica FCA Champions: 3
 2012–13, 2014–15, 2015–16
 Eastern Attica FCA Cup: 2
 2014–15, 2017–18

Players

Current squad

External links
 Official website

Football clubs in Attica
Association football clubs established in 1957
1957 establishments in Greece
Gamma Ethniki clubs